Hoodoo Voodoo is an EP by Australian rock group Hoodoo Gurus and was released by Mushroom Records in February 1997. This EP includes several tracks from the band's seventh studio album Blue Cave including "Down on Me", "Son of a Gun", and "Mind the Spider". Also includes extended remixes of "Son of a Gun" and "Down on Me" as well as an additional track "Whoopee Cushion".

Track listing
All tracks written by Dave Faulkner.
 "Down on Me" — 2:56
 "Son of a Gun" — 3:57
 "Mind the Spider" — 6:30
 "Whoopee Cushion" - 4:54
 "Son of a Gun" (Attractive Head Inc remix) — 7:59
 "Down on Me" (Attractive Head Inc remix) — 6:45

Personnel
 Dave Faulkner
 Mark Kingsmill
 Brad Shepherd
 Richard Grossman
Producers — Charles Fisher, Hoodoo Gurus, Attractive Head Inc (additional production)
Engineers — Ben Suthers (tracks 1, 2, 5, 6), Scott Rashleigh (tracks 3, 4)
Remixers — Attractive Head Inc (tracks 1, 2, 3, 5, 6), Mr & Mrs Chill (aka Stuart McCarthy and Melinda McCarthy of Southend) (track 4)

References

Hoodoo Gurus albums
1997 debut EPs